Robert Butts may refer to:

 Robert Hamilton Butts (1871–1943), Canadian politician, barrister and lawyer
 Robert Butts (bishop) (1684–1748), English churchman and bishop
 Robert Earl Butts (1977–2018), American convicted murderer